The 2006 Croatian Cup Final was a two-legged affair played between  Rijeka and Varteks. 
The first leg was played in Rijeka on 26 April 2006, while the second leg on 3 May 2006 in Varaždin.

Rijeka won the trophy on away goals rule after was an affair finished on aggregate result of 5–5.

Road to the final

First leg

Second leg

External links
Official website 

2006 Final
HNK Rijeka matches
NK Varaždin matches
Cup Final